Frontispiece  may refer to:

 Book frontispiece, a decorative illustration facing a book's title page
 Frontispiece (architecture), the combination of elements that frame and decorate the main, or front, door to a building